Aleksei Valeryevich Serebryakov (born 10 July 1976) is a former Russian professional football player.

Club career
He played in the Russian Football National League for FC Sodovik Sterlitamak in 2007.

References

1976 births
Living people
Russian footballers
Association football midfielders
FC Olimpia Volgograd players
FC Sodovik Sterlitamak players
FC Sakhalin Yuzhno-Sakhalinsk players